Don Quixote, Op. 50  is an opera in three acts by Wilhelm Kienzl. The libretto, written by the composer, is based on the novel by Miguel de Cervantes.

Composition history
Kienzl composed the opera in 1896, completing the full score on 9 October 1897, the 350th birthday of Cervantes (according to the composer's note in the score Cervantes was born on 9 October 1547). He dedicated the opera to "" ("the Manes of the great Cervantes"). The score was published by Musikverlages Bote & G. Bock Berlin GmbH, now part of Boosey & Hawkes.

Performance history
The opera was first performed at the Neues Königliches Opernhaus (Königliche Hofoper) in Berlin 
on 18 November 1898 with Carl Muck conducting. It was not favourably received by the audience, nor by the Berlin press, and only four more performances followed. The fifth performance was (and still remains) the last fully staged one of the complete unabbreviated work, which takes over three hours (without intermission). Kienzl abbreviated the work for a performance the same year at the Neues Deutsches Theater in Prague; again the reception was divided. Although a production run in Graz in 1905 met with greater success, the opera was not staged again for almost thirty years. A new abbreviated version was premiered in Graz on 1 May 1934, and then at the Vienna State Opera on 22 November 1936.

The only production in a non-German speaking country was in Moscow in 1911.

The opera was revived in a concert performance conducted by Gustav Kuhn at the Konzerthaus Berlin on 22 March 1998. (see also section Recordings)

Roles

Instrumentation
The orchestral score requires: 
3 flutes (flute 3 doubling piccolo), 2 oboes (oboe 2 doubling English horn), 2 clarinets, bass clarinet, 2 bassoons, contrabassoon;
4 horns, 3 trumpets, 3 trombones, tuba;
timpani, percussion, 2 harps;
strings (violins I, violins II, violas, violoncellos, double basses).

Recordings
In 2002 CPO released a recording made during rehearsals and concert performance (19–22 March 1998) of the revival in Berlin with Gustav Kuhn conducting the Rundfunk-Sinfonieorchester Berlin. The principal roles were sung by Thomas Mohr (Don Quixote), Michelle Breedt (Mercedes) and James Wagner (Sancho Pansa).

Notes

Operas by Wilhelm Kienzl
1898 operas
Operas set in Spain
German-language operas
Operas
Opera world premieres at the Berlin State Opera
Operas based on Don Quixote